Chichaklu (also Romanized as Chīchaklū; also known as Chīchalū and Cheklū) is a village in Chichaklu Rural District of Ahmadabad-e Mostowfi District of Eslamshahr County, Tehran province, Iran. At the 2006 National Census, its population was 2,196 in 570 households, when it was in Deh Abbas Rural District of the Central District. The following census in 2011 counted 2,532 people in 709 households. The latest census in 2016 showed a population of 2,656 people in 782 households, by which time it was in the newly formed Chichaklu Rural District of Ahmadabad-e Mostowfi District as the rural district's largest village.

References 

Eslamshahr County

Populated places in Tehran Province

Populated places in Eslamshahr County